Events from the year 1965 in Pakistan.

Incumbents

Federal government 
President: Ayub Khan
Chief Justice: A.R. Cornelius

Events

January
2 January, President Ayub Khan defeats Fatima Jinnah  in   presidential election

September
 6 September,  Beginning of the  Indo-Pakistan war

See also
 1964 in Pakistan
 1966 in Pakistan
 List of Pakistani films of 1966
 Timeline of Pakistani history